Stuart Reid is a Scottish writer and the author of the Gorgeous George series of children's books.

Background
Reid lived in Dubai for two years, working as a manager for the Premier Inn hotel chain.  He managed the chain's first hotel outside Britain, a 300-room hotel in Dubai. In 2009 Reid decided to return to Scotland with a plan to make a living writing books for children.

Gorgeous George
Reid's first book Gorgeous George and the Giant Geriatric Generator was released in 2011. It is the story of a fictitious town where people go missing, and the main character sets out to find them. The book was illustrated by Calvin Innes.

Innes, then still a student at university, decided not only to illustrate the book but to found a publishing company, My Little Big Town (MLBT), to publish it.  The company was launched in 2011 at the Enterprise Centre of Hull University.

Performances
Reid promotes his books by speaking at schools and children's events,  and has performed at schools in Dubai, Hong Kong and Australia. According to The Advertiser newspaper in Adelaide, Australia, Reid "has found a clever way to sell more books" by travelling the festival circuit doing funny talks about books and writing for kids. He has appeared at the Edinburgh Fringe and the Adelaide Fringe.

Personal life
Reid lives near Falkirk with his wife and their two daughters.

Gorgeous George books
Gorgeous George and the Giant Geriatric Generator (2011) Published by My Little Big Town
Gorgeous George and the Zigzag Zit-faced Zombies Published by Gorgeous Garage Publishing
Gorgeous George and the Unidentified Unsinkable Underpants Part 1 Published by Gorgeous Garage Publishing
Gorgeous George and the Unidentified Unsinkable Underpants Part 2 Published by Gorgeous Garage Publishing
Gorgeous George and his Stupid Stinky Stories Published by Gorgeous Garage Publishing
Gorgeous George and the Jumbo Jobby Juicer (2017) Published by Gorgeous Garage Publishing
Gorgeous George and the Timewarp Trouser Trumpets Published by Gorgeous Garage Publishing
Gorgeous George and the Incredible Iron-Bru-Man Incident

References

External links
 Official website
 A Writers' Responsibility: How I Get Young People Interested In Reading, Stuart Reid on HuffPost

Scottish children's writers
Living people
21st-century Scottish writers
Year of birth missing (living people)
Place of birth missing (living people)
People from Falkirk